The Cooke triplet is a photographic lens designed and patented (patent number GB 22,607) in 1893 by Dennis Taylor who was employed as chief engineer by T. Cooke & Sons of York. It was the first lens system that allowed elimination of most of the optical distortion or aberration at the outer edge of the image.

The Cooke triplet is noted for being able to correct the Seidel aberrations. It is recognized as one of the most important objective designs in the field of photography.

The lens designed, invented by Dennis Taylor but named for the firm he worked for, consists of three separated lens elements. It has two biconvex lenses on the outer and a biconcave lens in the middle.

The design took a new approach to solving the optical design issues, and the design was presented to the Optical Society of London.

Design

A Cooke triplet comprises a negative flint glass element in the centre with a crown glass element on each side. In this design, the sum of all the curvatures times indices of refraction can be zero, so that the field of focus is flat (zero Petzval field curvature). In other words, the negative lens can be as strong as the outer two combined, when one measures in dioptres, yet the lens will converge light, because the rays strike the middle element close to the optical axis. The curvature of field is determined by the sum of the dioptres, but the focal length is not.

At the time, the Cooke triplet was a major advancement in lens design. It was superseded by later designs in high-end cameras, but is still widely used in inexpensive cameras, including variations using aspheric elements, particularly in cell-phone cameras.

The Cooke triplet can correct, with only three elements, for one wavelength, spherical aberration, coma, astigmatism, field curvature, and distortion.

Application 

The triplet soon became a standard in lens design still used with low-end cameras today. The main optical manufacturers often further developed the original Cooke triplet (e.g., the Zeiss Triotar) that were produced for many decades.

Binoculars as well as refracting telescopes often use triplets. The same holds for many projection lenses, e.g., for 35 mm slide projectors.

The Cooke triplet has provided the basis for additional designs, including a derivative with five lens elements.

See also 
 Achromatic lens
 Chromatic aberration
 Triplet lens

References

External links
Explanation of triplets from Fundamental Optical Design

Photographic lens designs